DXMF (576 AM) Bombo Radyo is a radio station owned and operated by Bombo Radyo Philippines through its licensee People's Broadcasting Service, Inc. Its studio and offices are located at Bombo Radyo Broadcast Center, San Pedro St., Davao City; its transmitter is located at Brgy. Ma-a, Davao City.

References

Radio stations established in 1975
Radio stations in Davao City
News and talk radio stations in the Philippines